Flip Klomp (born 18 October 2001) is a Dutch football player. He plays as a central midfielder for Eredivisie club Volendam.

Club career
Klomp studied business administration in the Virginia Commonwealth University in the US for a year and a half. On 24 January 2023, Klomp signed a two-and-a-half year contract with Volendam.

He made his Eredivisie debut for Volendam on 29 January 2023 in a game against Groningen.

References

External links
 

2001 births
Footballers from Arnhem
Living people
Dutch footballers
Association football midfielders
VCU Rams men's soccer players
FC Volendam players
Eredivisie players
Tweede Divisie players
Dutch expatriate footballers
Expatriate soccer players in the United States
Dutch expatriate sportspeople in the United States